Brachmia deltopis is a moth in the family Gelechiidae. It was described by Edward Meyrick in 1920. It is found in Kenya and Uganda.

The larvae feed on Hibiscus micranthus.

References

Moths described in 1920
Brachmia
Taxa named by Edward Meyrick
Moths of Africa